John Job Ayo Akinde (born 8 July 1989) is an English professional footballer who plays for League Two club Colchester United.  He previously played for Barnet from 2014–2018 and for Lincoln City from 2018–2020. In the 2014–15 season, he led the Conference Premier league in scoring, helping Barnet win the league. In the 2018–19 season, he led Lincoln City in scoring, helping them win League Two.

Career
Akinde's youth career started at Tottenham.  Akinde played for Ebbsfleet United where he was a graduate of the club's academy under their previous name, Gravesend and Northfleet. In 28 league appearances for Gravesend/Ebbsfleet, Akinde scored 10 goals, he also won the FA Trophy with Ebbsfleet in the season before joining Bristol City, laying on the winning goal in the final at Wembley against Torquay United. He had a loan spell at Margate and two loan spells at Whitstable Town.

Bristol City, 2008-2011 
In 2008, Akinde was sold to Bristol City for £140,000 following the first ever transfer decided by a fans poll, in this case by the members of MyFootballClub.

He scored on his debut for Bristol City in a 2–2 draw against Plymouth Argyle. Later in the season, Akinde signed for an initial month on loan to Wycombe Wanderers, on 11 March 2009. He also scored on his Wycombe debut, netting twice against Brentford in a 3–3 draw. Further goals against Barnet and Darlington led to the loan deal being extended until the end of the season.

On 13 November 2009, he returned to Wycombe Wanderers on a month's loan, this later being extended to two months, but he was recalled early by Bristol City on 7 January 2010. On 1 February 2010, Akinde joined Brentford on a month's loan, making two league appearances, one of which against former loan club Wycombe Wanderers.

He went out on loan for a fourth time in August 2010 when he joined Bristol Rovers in a deal scheduled to last until 5 January. In January 2011 Akinde joined Dagenham & Redbridge on loan until the end of the season.

Crawley Town, 2011-2013 
On 27 May 2011, newly promoted Crawley Town beat off higher league competition to sign Akinde for the 2011–12 season. He scored his first league goal for Crawley Town away to Shrewsbury Town at the New Meadow on 27 February 2012. On 17 March 2012, Akinde joined fellow League Two side Dagenham & Redbridge on loan for the remainder of the season, along with Charlie Wassmer. However, on 12 April 2012, Crawley recalled Akinde and fellow loanee Charlie Wassmer, to their push for promotion from League Two.

On 31 January 2013, Akinde was released by Crawley. On 8 February, he joined Portsmouth in a month-to-month contract. He made his debut a day later, against Bournemouth.

Akinde was released by Portsmouth at the end of the season, after failing to score in his 11 appearances for Pompey. He signed for Alfreton Town in August 2013 on a one-year contract. He made his debut against Kidderminster Harriers before scoring a hat-trick in his second game as Alfreton beat Salisbury City 3–2. He scored 18 goals in 42 league gamesthat season.

Barnet, 2014-2018 
Akinde joined Barnet on a two-year deal on 24 May 2014. In his first season for the club he scored 31 league goals making him the division's top goal scorer, as Barnet won the Conference Premier. In the 2015–16 season, Akinde scored 23 goals, helping the team to a 15th-placed finish and finishing as the 3rd top goal scorer in the League. At the end of the season, Akinde signed a three-year-deal. On 22 April 2017, Akinde scored his 48th English Football League goal for the Bees to become their highest-ever League goalscorer, surpassing Sean Devine's record. He was transfer-listed by Barnet at the end of the 2017–18 season.

2018 – present 
On 6 July 2018, Akinde signed a three-year deal with League Two club Lincoln City, and top scored for the Imps in the 2018–19 season as they won League Two. 

On 24 January 2020 he joined League One side Gillingham for an undisclosed fee. He made his debut for the club the following day in a 2–2 away league draw against Rochdale, where he provided an assist for Gillingham's second goal. Akinde attracted interest in the January 2021 transfer window from Exeter City but nothing materialised and he remained at Gillingham.

On 27 January 2022, Akinde reached a mutual agreement with Gillingham to terminate his contract and signed a two-and-a-half year contract with EFL League Two side Colchester United. He made his league debut for the Essex side two days later, appearing as a 66th minute substitute in 1–1 home draw against Swindon Town and providing an assist for the 92nd minute equaliser by teammate Emyr Huws.

Personal life 
Akinde was born in Camberwell, South London and is of Nigerian descent. Akinde's brother Sam (born 1993) has also played at Ebbsfleet, Alfreton and Barnet. The brothers have played together at the latter two clubs.

Career statistics

Honours
Ebbsfleet United
 FA Trophy: 2007–08

Wycombe Wanderers
Football League Two third-place promotion: 2008–09

Crawley Town
Football League Two third-place promotion: 2011–12

Barnet
Conference Premier: 2014–15

Lincoln City
EFL League Two: 2018–19

Individual
Conference Premier Player of the Month: December 2014
Barnet Player of the Year: 2014–15, 2016–17
Barnet Player's Player of the Year: 2014–15, 2016–17
Non-League Footballer's Association Player of the Year: 2014–15
Conference Premier Team of the Year: 2014–15
PFA Team of the Year: 2018-19 League Two

Notes

References

External links 
 John Akinde profile at Alfreton Town F.C.
 
 

1989 births
Footballers from Camberwell
Living people
English footballers
English people of Nigerian descent
Black British sportspeople
Association football forwards
Ebbsfleet United F.C. players
Whitstable Town F.C. players
Margate F.C. players
Bristol City F.C. players
Wycombe Wanderers F.C. players
Brentford F.C. players
Bristol Rovers F.C. players
Dagenham & Redbridge F.C. players
Crawley Town F.C. players
Portsmouth F.C. players
Alfreton Town F.C. players
Barnet F.C. players
Lincoln City F.C. players
Gillingham F.C. players
Colchester United F.C. players
English Football League players
National League (English football) players
Isthmian League players